Manglutan is a village in Andaman district on the south coast of South Andaman Island, belonging to India. The 60 acre Manglutan Rubber Plantation was established at Manglutan in 1960/61.
The Dhanikari Stream flows near here.

References

Villages in South Andaman district
South Andaman Island